Stefan Weber (8 November 1946 – 7 June 2018) was an Austrian art teacher and the lead singer and Kapellmeister of the Viennese band Drahdiwaberl.

Weber founded the band in 1969 in the wake of the events of 1968. Drahdiwaberl are infamous for their elaborate stage shows which often include bizarre and, as some claim, disgusting elements. For example, in 2003 Weber was charged with illegal possession of firearms after using a pistol on stage. They also presented considerably controversial material, such as the song called "Ganz Wien (ist heut' auf Heroin)" ("All Vienna [is hooked on heroin today]"), which was subsequently banned by the authorities.

Their only hit record in Austria was the song Lonely produced with Lukas Resetarits which peaked at number four on the charts. in the Austrian Single charts.
In 1985 the band was able to return into the Austrian charts with the Song Mulatschag. Due to its moderate success it has been one of the last single released so far.

The three albums Psychoterror, MC Ronalds Massaker and Werwolfromantik peaked in the Austrian Top-Ten album charts and every album sold more than 30.000 copies. Psychoterror was certified with Gold in Austria.

As a former high school teacher, Weber had a natural talent of appealing to people in their late teens and early twenties, who are among his most dedicated fans. Early in his career, Falco played bass for Drahdiwaberl. After his leaving in 1983, he and the band produced the single Die Galeere.

He was cremated at Feuerhalle Simmering, where also his ashes are buried.

Drahdiwaberl have been announcing their final concert on a regular basis for many years now.

Discography of Drahdiwaberl
Albums

Singles

References

External links
 Drahdiwaberl.at
 Weltrevolution-derfilm.at
 Drahdiwaberl Concerts in Vienna Videos

1946 births
2018 deaths
Austrian male musicians
Alternative rock musicians
Musicians from Vienna
Burials at Feuerhalle Simmering